Walter (Sydney) Masterman (19 December 1876 – 16 May 1946) was an English author of mystery, fantasy, horror and science fiction.

Biography

Masterman was born in Wimbledon, London on 19 December 1876, the son of Thomas William Masterman. Initially educated at Tonbridge School and Weymouth College, he entered Christ's College, Cambridge in 1897, where he was a football blue. Played football with his brother H W Masterman for amongst others Tunbridge Wells and is referred to in the "History of the Football Association" published in 1953 for an article he wrote in 1911 on the dispute between the Amateur Football Association and the Football Association. Served as a lieutenant in the 3rd Battalion Welsh Regiment in the Second Boer War, 1900–02; was made a captain in 1901. He was the joint headmaster of Horsmonden School, Kent, 1903-05. Also served in the Great War as a Major with the Welsh Regiment (1914–19).

Death
Walter S. Masterman died in Brighton on 16 May 1946.

Bibliography

 The Wrong Letter (1926)
 The Curse of the Reckaviles (1927)
 2 LO (1928)
 The Green Toad (1929)
 The Bloodhounds Bay (1930)
 The Yellow Mistletoe (1930)
 The Mystery of 52 (aka The Mystery of Fifty-Two) (1931)
 The Flying Beast (1932)
 Murder Beacon (1932), written with L. Patrick Greene
 The Nameless Crime (1932)
 The Crime of the Reckaviles (1934)
 The Baddington Horror (1934)
 The Perjured Alibi (1935)
 Death Turns Traitor (1936)
 The Rose of Death (1936)
 The Avenger Strikes (1937)
 The Border Line (1937)
 The Hunted Man (1938)
 The Wrong Verdict (1938)
 The Secret of the Downs (1939)
 The Hooded Monster (1939)
 The Curse of Cantire (1940)
 The Death Coins (1940)
 Back From the Grave (1940)
 The Silver Leopard (1941)
 The Man without a Head (1942)

External links

English fantasy writers
English horror writers
English mystery writers
English science fiction writers
1870s births
1946 deaths
English male short story writers
English short story writers
English male novelists
20th-century English novelists
20th-century British short story writers
20th-century English male writers
English male non-fiction writers
Alumni of Christ's College, Cambridge
British military personnel of the Second Boer War
British Army personnel of World War I
Welch Regiment officers
People educated at Tonbridge School